The United States national speedway team are an international speedway team from the United States who compete in the annual major international speedway competitions including the Speedway World Cup and Speedway of Nations and the former events the Speedway World Team Cup and the Speedway World Pairs Championship. They are managed by Lance King, who finished third in the 1984 World Final and the current captain is triple and four times world champion Greg Hancock. The team is governed by the American Motorcyclist Association.

After Jack Milne and his brother Cordy had finished first and third at the 1937 World Final (with another American Wilbur Lamoreaux finishing second), the USA went into the speedway wilderness until the early 1970s when international riders such as World Champions Barry Briggs and Ivan Mauger from New Zealand began visiting the Costa Mesa Speedway in Los Angeles. After World War II, Scott Autrey's appearance in the 1976 World Final in Poland was the first American appearance since Ernie Roccio had finished 15th in 1951.

Autrey, who in the mid-1970s had campaigned hard and successfully to have American riders included in the Speedway World Championship, signalled an American resurgence in speedway and was soon followed by others such as 1981 and 1982 world champion Bruce Penhall, brothers Kelly and Shawn Moran, Bobby Schwartz, Dennis Sigalos, Lance King, 1993 world champion Sam Ermolenko, Rick Miller, 1996 world champion Billy Hamill, and four times world champion Greg Hancock all going on to be regarded as some of the world's best speedway riders.

Speedway World Cup 
The USA national speedway team has won the Speedway World Team Cup on five occasions, including their first win in 1982 which gave the USA the "Triple Crown" of speedway by winning the Individual, World Pairs and World Team Cup in the same year (the WTC was actually the first victory of the three). The USA were a major force in the early 1990s, winning 3 out of 4 tournaments. Key riding members of the title wins include Billy Hamill (4 wins), Sam Ermolenko and Greg Hancock (both 3 wins). The cup has eluded the USA since 1998 and the team has become weaker due to the retirements of Sam Ermolenko and Billy Hamill, and a lack of recognised experienced riders in Europe.

The finals of both the 1985 and 1988 World Team Cups were held at the Veterans Memorial Stadium in Long Beach, California. In the 41-year history of the WTC, these were the only times that the finals were held outside of Great Britain or Europe.

Honours

World Championships

* Shawn Moran was stripped of his 1990 Individual World Championship Silver Medal by the FIM after a failed drug test.

Titles

Notable American riders 

Scott Autrey
Scott Brant
John Cook
Ronnie Correy
Sam Ermolenko
Ryan Fisher
Billy Hamill
Greg Hancock
Tommy Hedden
Billy Janniro
Chris Kerr
Lance King
Wilbur Lamoreaux
Josh Larsen
Steve Lucero
Rick Miller
Cordy Milne
Jack Milne
Kelly Moran
Shawn Moran
Bruce Penhall
Ron Preston
Bobby Schwartz
Dennis Sigalos
Charlie Venegas
Ricky Wells
Brent Werner

See also
 AMA National Speedway Championship
 United States Speedway National Championship

References 

National speedway teams
Speedway
!